The Liver Birds is a BBC television sitcom.

The Liver Birds or similar terms can also refer to:

 Liver bird, symbolic bird of Liverpool
 The Liverbirds, English girl band
 Liverbirds (album), a 2010 album by Joey Cape and Jon Snodgrass